A variable star is a star whose brightness as seen from Earth (its apparent magnitude) changes with time. This variation may be caused by a change in emitted light or by something partly blocking the light, so variable stars are classified as either:
 Intrinsic variables, whose luminosity actually changes; for example, because the star periodically swells and shrinks.
 Extrinsic variables, whose apparent changes in brightness are due to changes in the amount of their light that can reach Earth; for example, because the star has an orbiting companion that sometimes eclipses it.

Many, possibly most, stars have at least some variation in luminosity: the energy output of the Sun, for example, varies by about 0.1% over an 11-year solar cycle.

Discovery
An ancient Egyptian calendar of lucky and unlucky days composed some 3,200 years ago may be the oldest preserved historical document of the discovery of a variable star,
the eclipsing binary Algol.

Of the modern astronomers, the first variable star was identified in 1638 when Johannes Holwarda noticed that Omicron Ceti (later named Mira) pulsated in a cycle taking 11 months; the star had previously been described as a nova by David Fabricius in 1596. This discovery, combined with supernovae observed in 1572 and 1604, proved that the starry sky was not eternally invariable as Aristotle and other ancient philosophers had taught. In this way, the discovery of variable stars contributed to the astronomical revolution of the sixteenth and early seventeenth centuries.

The second variable star to be described was the eclipsing variable Algol, by Geminiano Montanari in 1669; John Goodricke gave the correct explanation of its variability in 1784. Chi Cygni was identified in 1686 by G. Kirch, then R Hydrae in 1704 by G. D. Maraldi. By 1786, ten variable stars were known. John Goodricke himself discovered Delta Cephei and Beta Lyrae. Since 1850, the number of known variable stars has increased rapidly, especially after 1890 when it became possible to identify variable stars by means of photography.

The latest edition of the General Catalogue of Variable Stars (2008) lists more than 46,000 variable stars in the Milky Way, as well as 10,000 in other galaxies, and over 10,000 'suspected' variables.

Detecting variability

The most common kinds of variability involve changes in brightness, but other types of variability also occur, in particular changes in the spectrum. By combining light curve data with observed spectral changes, astronomers are often able to explain why a particular star is variable.

Variable star observations

Variable stars are generally analysed using photometry, spectrophotometry and spectroscopy. Measurements of their changes in brightness can be plotted to produce light curves. For regular variables, the period of variation and its amplitude can be very well established; for many variable stars, though, these quantities may vary slowly over time, or even from one period to the next. Peak brightnesses in the light curve are known as maxima, while troughs are known as minima.

Amateur astronomers can do useful scientific study of variable stars by visually comparing the star with other stars within the same telescopic field of view of which the magnitudes are known and constant. By estimating the variable's magnitude and noting the time of observation a visual lightcurve can be constructed. The American Association of Variable Star Observers collects such observations from participants around the world and shares the data with the scientific community.

From the light curve the following data are derived:
 are the brightness variations periodical, semiperiodical, irregular, or unique?
 what is the period of the brightness fluctuations?
 what is the shape of the light curve (symmetrical or not, angular or smoothly varying, does each cycle have only one or more than one minima, etcetera)?

From the spectrum the following data are derived:
 what kind of star is it: what is its temperature, its luminosity class (dwarf star, giant star, supergiant, etc.)?
 is it a single star, or a binary? (the combined spectrum of a binary star may show elements from the spectra of each of the member stars)
 does the spectrum change with time? (for example, the star may turn hotter and cooler periodically)
 changes in brightness may depend strongly on the part of the spectrum that is observed (for example, large variations in visible light but hardly any changes in the infrared)
 if the wavelengths of spectral lines are shifted this points to movements (for example, a periodical swelling and shrinking of the star, or its rotation, or an expanding gas shell) (Doppler effect)
 strong magnetic fields on the star betray themselves in the spectrum
 abnormal emission or absorption lines may be indication of a hot stellar atmosphere, or gas clouds surrounding the star.

In very few cases it is possible to make pictures of a stellar disk. These may show darker spots on its surface.

Interpretation of observations
Combining light curves with spectral data often gives a clue as to the changes that occur in a variable star. For example, evidence for a pulsating star is found in its shifting spectrum because its surface periodically moves toward and away from us, with the same frequency as its changing brightness.

About two-thirds of all variable stars appear to be pulsating. In the 1930s astronomer Arthur Stanley Eddington showed that the mathematical equations that describe the interior of a star may lead to instabilities that cause a star to pulsate. The most common type of instability is related to oscillations in the degree of ionization in outer, convective layers of the star.

When the star is in the swelling phase, its outer layers expand, causing them to cool. Because of the decreasing temperature the degree of ionization also decreases. This makes the gas more transparent, and thus makes it easier for the star to radiate its energy. This in turn makes the star start to contract. As the gas is thereby compressed, it is heated and the degree of ionization again increases. This makes the gas more opaque, and radiation temporarily becomes captured in the gas. This heats the gas further, leading it to expand once again. Thus a cycle of expansion and compression (swelling and shrinking) is maintained.

The pulsation of cepheids is known to be driven by oscillations in the ionization of helium (from He++ to He+ and back to He++).

Nomenclature

In a given constellation, the first variable stars discovered were designated with letters R through Z, e.g. R Andromedae. This system of nomenclature was developed by Friedrich W. Argelander, who gave the first previously unnamed variable in a constellation the letter R, the first letter not used by Bayer. Letters RR through RZ, SS through SZ, up to ZZ are used for the next discoveries, e.g. RR Lyrae. Later discoveries used letters AA through AZ, BB through BZ, and up to QQ through QZ (with J omitted). Once those 334 combinations are exhausted, variables are numbered in order of discovery, starting with the prefixed V335 onwards.

Classification

Variable stars may be either intrinsic or extrinsic.
 Intrinsic variable stars: stars where the variability is being caused by changes in the physical properties of the stars themselves. This category can be divided into three subgroups.
 Pulsating variables, stars whose radius alternately expands and contracts as part of their natural evolutionary ageing processes.
 Eruptive variables, stars who experience eruptions on their surfaces like flares or mass ejections.
 Cataclysmic or explosive variables, stars that undergo a cataclysmic change in their properties like novae and supernovae.
 Extrinsic variable stars: stars where the variability is caused by external properties like rotation or eclipses. There are two main subgroups.
 Eclipsing binaries, double stars where, as seen from Earth's vantage point the stars occasionally eclipse one another as they orbit.
 Rotating variables, stars whose variability is caused by phenomena related to their rotation. Examples are stars with extreme "sunspots" which affect the apparent brightness or stars that have fast rotation speeds causing them to become ellipsoidal in shape.

These subgroups themselves are further divided into specific types of variable stars that are usually named after their prototype. For example, dwarf novae are designated U Geminorum stars after the first recognized star in the class, U Geminorum.

Intrinsic variable stars

Examples of types within these divisions are given below.

Pulsating variable stars

Pulsating stars swell and shrink, affecting their brightness and spectrum. Pulsations are generally split into: radial, where the entire star expands and shrinks as a whole; and non-radial, where one part of the star expands while another part shrinks.

Depending on the type of pulsation and its location within the star, there is a natural or fundamental frequency which determines the period of the star. Stars may also pulsate in a harmonic or overtone which is a higher frequency, corresponding to a shorter period. Pulsating variable stars sometimes have a single well-defined period, but often they pulsate simultaneously with multiple frequencies and complex analysis is required to determine the separate interfering periods. In some cases, the pulsations do not have a defined frequency, causing a random variation, referred to as stochastic. The study of stellar interiors using their pulsations is known as asteroseismology.

The expansion phase of a pulsation is caused by the blocking of the internal energy flow by material with a high opacity, but this must occur at a particular depth of the star to create visible pulsations. If the expansion occurs below a convective zone then no variation will be visible at the surface. If the expansion occurs too close to the surface the restoring force will be too weak to create a pulsation. The restoring force to create the contraction phase of a pulsation can be pressure if the pulsation occurs in a non-degenerate layer deep inside a star, and this is called an acoustic or pressure mode of pulsation, abbreviated to p-mode. In other cases, the restoring force is gravity and this is called a g-mode. Pulsating variable stars typically pulsate in only one of these modes.

Cepheids and cepheid-like variables 

This group consists of several kinds of pulsating stars, all found on the instability strip, that swell and shrink very regularly caused by the star's own mass resonance, generally by the fundamental frequency. Generally the Eddington valve mechanism for pulsating variables is believed to account for cepheid-like pulsations. Each of the subgroups on the instability strip has a fixed relationship between period and absolute magnitude, as well as a relation between period and mean density of the star. The period-luminosity relationship was first established for Delta Cepheids by Henrietta Leavitt, and makes these high luminosity Cepheids very useful for determining distances to galaxies within the Local Group and beyond. Edwin Hubble used this method to prove that the so-called spiral nebulae are in fact distant galaxies.

Note that the Cepheids are named only for Delta Cephei, while a completely separate class of variables is named after Beta Cephei.

Classical Cepheid variables

Classical Cepheids (or Delta Cephei variables) are population I (young, massive, and luminous) yellow supergiants which undergo pulsations with very regular periods on the order of days to months. On September 10, 1784, Edward Pigott detected the variability of Eta Aquilae, the first known representative of the class of Cepheid variables. However, the namesake for classical Cepheids is the star Delta Cephei, discovered to be variable by John Goodricke a few months later.

Type II Cepheids

Type II Cepheids (historically termed W Virginis stars) have extremely regular light pulsations and a luminosity relation much like the δ Cephei variables, so initially they were confused with the latter category. Type II Cepheids stars belong to older Population II stars, than do the type I Cepheids. The Type II have somewhat lower metallicity, much lower mass, somewhat lower luminosity, and a slightly offset period versus luminosity relationship, so it is always important to know which type of star is being observed.

RR Lyrae variables

These stars are somewhat similar to Cepheids, but are not as luminous and have shorter periods. They are older than type I Cepheids, belonging to Population II, but of lower mass than type II Cepheids. Due to their common occurrence in globular clusters, they are occasionally referred to as cluster Cepheids. They also have a well established period-luminosity relationship, and so are also useful as distance indicators. These A-type stars vary by about 0.2–2 magnitudes (20% to over 500% change in luminosity) over a period of several hours to a day or more.

Delta Scuti variables

Delta Scuti (δ Sct) variables are similar to Cepheids but much fainter and with much shorter periods. They were once known as Dwarf Cepheids. They often show many superimposed periods, which combine to form an extremely complex light curve. The typical δ Scuti star has an amplitude of 0.003–0.9 magnitudes (0.3% to about 130% change in luminosity) and a period of 0.01–0.2 days. Their spectral type is usually between A0 and F5.

SX Phoenicis variables

These stars of spectral type A2 to F5, similar to δ Scuti variables, are found mainly in globular clusters. They exhibit fluctuations in their brightness in the order of 0.7 magnitude (about 100% change in luminosity) or so every 1 to 2 hours.

Rapidly oscillating Ap variables

These stars of spectral type A or occasionally F0, a sub-class of δ Scuti variables found on the main sequence. They have extremely rapid variations with periods of a few minutes and amplitudes of a few thousandths of a magnitude.

Long period variables

The long period variables are cool evolved stars that pulsate with periods in the range of weeks to several years.

Mira variables

Mira variables are Asymptotic giant branch (AGB) red giants. Over periods of many months they fade and brighten by between 2.5 and 11 magnitudes, a 6 fold to 30,000 fold change in luminosity. Mira itself, also known as Omicron Ceti (ο Cet), varies in brightness from almost 2nd magnitude to as faint as 10th magnitude with a period of roughly 332 days. The very large visual amplitudes are mainly due to the shifting of energy output between visual and infra-red as the temperature of the star changes. In a few cases, Mira variables show dramatic period changes over a period of decades, thought to be related to the thermal pulsing cycle of the most advanced AGB stars.

Semiregular variables

These are red giants or supergiants. Semiregular variables may show a definite period on occasion, but more often show less well-defined variations that can sometimes be resolved into multiple periods. A well-known example of a semiregular variable is Betelgeuse, which varies from about magnitudes +0.2 to +1.2 (a factor 2.5 change in luminosity). At least some of the semi-regular variables are very closely related to Mira variables, possibly the only difference being pulsating in a different harmonic.

Slow irregular variables

These are red giants or supergiants with little or no detectable periodicity. Some are poorly studied semiregular variables, often with multiple periods, but others may simply be chaotic.

Long secondary period variables

Many variable red giants and supergiants show variations over several hundred to several thousand days. The brightness may change by several magnitudes although it is often much smaller, with the more rapid primary variations are superimposed. The reasons for this type of variation are not clearly understood, being variously ascribed to pulsations, binarity, and stellar rotation.

Beta Cephei variables

Beta Cephei (β Cep) variables (sometimes called Beta Canis Majoris variables, especially in Europe) undergo short period pulsations in the order of 0.1–0.6 days with an amplitude of 0.01–0.3 magnitudes (1% to 30% change in luminosity). They are at their brightest during minimum contraction. Many stars of this kind exhibits multiple pulsation periods.

Slowly pulsating B-type stars

Slowly pulsating B (SPB) stars are hot main-sequence stars slightly less luminous than the Beta Cephei stars, with longer periods and larger amplitudes.

Very rapidly pulsating hot (subdwarf B) stars

The prototype of this rare class is V361 Hydrae, a 15th magnitude subdwarf B star. They pulsate with periods of a few minutes and may simultaneous pulsate with multiple periods. They have amplitudes of a few hundredths of a magnitude and are given the GCVS acronym RPHS. They are p-mode pulsators.

PV Telescopii variables

Stars in this class are type Bp supergiants with a period of 0.1–1 day and an amplitude of 0.1 magnitude on average. Their spectra are peculiar by having weak hydrogen while on the other hand carbon and helium lines are extra strong, a type of Extreme helium star.

RV Tauri variables

These are yellow supergiant stars (actually low mass post-AGB stars at the most luminous stage of their lives) which have alternating deep and shallow minima. This double-peaked variation typically has periods of 30–100 days and amplitudes of 3–4 magnitudes. Superimposed on this variation, there may be long-term variations over periods of several years. Their spectra are of type F or G at maximum light and type K or M at minimum brightness. They lie near the instability strip, cooler than type I Cepheids more luminous than type II Cepheids. Their pulsations are caused by the same basic mechanisms related to helium opacity, but they are at a very different stage of their lives.

Alpha Cygni variables

Alpha Cygni (α Cyg) variables are nonradially pulsating supergiants of spectral classes Bep to AepIa. Their periods range from several days to several weeks, and their amplitudes of variation are typically of the order of 0.1 magnitudes. The light changes, which often seem irregular, are caused by the superposition of many oscillations with close periods. Deneb, in the constellation of Cygnus is the prototype of this class.

Gamma Doradus variables

Gamma Doradus (γ Dor) variables are non-radially pulsating main-sequence stars of spectral classes F to late A. Their periods are around one day and their amplitudes typically of the order of 0.1 magnitudes.

Pulsating white dwarfs

These non-radially pulsating stars have short periods of hundreds to thousands of seconds with tiny fluctuations of 0.001 to 0.2 magnitudes. Known types of pulsating white dwarf (or pre-white dwarf) include the DAV, or ZZ Ceti, stars, with hydrogen-dominated atmospheres and the spectral type DA; DBV, or V777 Her, stars, with helium-dominated atmospheres and the spectral type DB; and GW Vir stars, with atmospheres dominated by helium, carbon, and oxygen. GW Vir stars may be subdivided into DOV and PNNV stars.

Solar-like oscillations 
The Sun oscillates with very low amplitude in a large number of modes having periods around 5 minutes. The study of these oscillations is known as helioseismology. Oscillations in the Sun are driven stochastically by convection in its outer layers. The term solar-like oscillations is used to describe oscillations in other stars that are excited in the same way and the study of these oscillations is one of the main areas of active research in the field of asteroseismology.

BLAP variables 

A Blue Large-Amplitude Pulsator (BLAP) is a pulsating star characterized by changes of 0.2 to 0.4 magnitudes with typical periods of 20 to 40 minutes.

Fast yellow pulsating supergiants 
A fast yellow pulsating supergiant (FYPS) is a luminous yellow supergiant with pulsations shorter than a day.  They are thought to have evolved beyond a red supergiant phase, but the mechanism for the pulsations is unknown.  The class was named in 2020 through analysis of TESS observations.

Eruptive variable stars

Eruptive variable stars show irregular or semi-regular brightness variations caused by material being lost from the star, or in some cases being accreted to it. Despite the name, these are not explosive events.

Protostars

Protostars are young objects that have not yet completed the process of contraction from a gas nebula to a veritable star. Most protostars exhibit irregular brightness variations.

Herbig Ae/Be stars

Variability of more massive (2–8 solar mass) Herbig Ae/Be stars is thought to be due to gas-dust clumps, orbiting in the circumstellar disks.

Orion variables

Orion variables are young, hot pre–main-sequence stars usually embedded in nebulosity. They have irregular periods with amplitudes of several magnitudes. A well-known subtype of Orion variables are the T Tauri variables. Variability of T Tauri stars is due to spots on the stellar surface and gas-dust clumps, orbiting in the circumstellar disks.

FU Orionis variables

These stars reside in reflection nebulae and show gradual increases in their luminosity in the order of 6 magnitudes followed by a lengthy phase of constant brightness. They then dim by 2 magnitudes (six times dimmer) or so over a period of many years. V1057 Cygni for example dimmed by 2.5 magnitude (ten times dimmer) during an eleven-year period. FU Orionis variables are of spectral type A through G and are possibly an evolutionary phase in the life of T Tauri stars.

Giants and supergiants

Large stars lose their matter relatively easily. For this reason variability due to eruptions and mass loss is fairly common among giants and supergiants.

Luminous blue variables

Also known as the S Doradus variables, the most luminous stars known belong to this class. Examples include the hypergiants η Carinae and P Cygni. They have permanent high mass loss, but at intervals of years internal pulsations cause the star to exceed its Eddington limit and the mass loss increases hugely. Visual brightness increases although the overall luminosity is largely unchanged. Giant eruptions observed in a few LBVs do increase the luminosity, so much so that they have been tagged supernova impostors, and may be a different type of event.

Yellow hypergiants

These massive evolved stars are unstable due to their high luminosity and position above the instability strip, and they exhibit slow but sometimes large photometric and spectroscopic changes due to high mass loss and occasional larger eruptions, combined with secular variation on an observable timescale. The best known example is Rho Cassiopeiae.

R Coronae Borealis variables

While classed as eruptive variables, these stars do not undergo periodic increases in brightness. Instead they spend most of their time at maximum brightness, but at irregular intervals they suddenly fade by 1–9 magnitudes (2.5 to 4000 times dimmer) before recovering to their initial brightness over months to years. Most are classified as yellow supergiants by luminosity, although they are actually post-AGB stars, but there are both red and blue giant R CrB stars. R Coronae Borealis (R CrB) is the prototype star. DY Persei variables are a subclass of R CrB variables that have a periodic variability in addition to their eruptions.

Wolf–Rayet variables

Classic population I Wolf–Rayet stars are massive hot stars that sometimes show variability, probably due to several different causes including binary interactions and rotating gas clumps around the star. They exhibit broad emission line spectra with helium, nitrogen, carbon and oxygen lines. Variations in some stars appear to be stochastic while others show multiple periods.

Gamma Cassiopeiae variables

Gamma Cassiopeiae (γ Cas) variables are non-supergiant fast-rotating B class emission line-type stars that fluctuate irregularly by up to 1.5 magnitudes (4 fold change in luminosity) due to the ejection of matter at their equatorial regions caused by the rapid rotational velocity.

Flare stars

In main-sequence stars major eruptive variability is exceptional. It is common only among the flare stars, also known as the UV Ceti variables, very faint main-sequence stars which undergo regular flares. They increase in brightness by up to two magnitudes (six times brighter) in just a few seconds, and then fade back to normal brightness in half an hour or less. Several nearby red dwarfs are flare stars, including Proxima Centauri and Wolf 359.

RS Canum Venaticorum variables

These are close binary systems with highly active chromospheres, including huge sunspots and flares, believed to be enhanced by the close companion. Variability scales ranges from days, close to the orbital period and sometimes also with eclipses, to years as sunspot activity varies.

Cataclysmic or explosive variable stars

Supernovae

Supernovae are the most dramatic type of cataclysmic variable, being some of the most energetic events in the universe. A supernova can briefly emit as much energy as an entire galaxy, brightening by more than 20 magnitudes (over one hundred million times brighter). The supernova explosion is caused by a white dwarf or a star core reaching a certain mass/density limit, the Chandrasekhar limit, causing the object to collapse in a fraction of a second. This collapse "bounces" and causes the star to explode and emit this enormous energy quantity. The outer layers of these stars are blown away at speeds of many thousands of kilometers per second. The expelled matter may form nebulae called supernova remnants. A well-known example of such a nebula is the Crab Nebula, left over from a supernova that was observed in China and elsewhere in 1054. The progenitor object may either disintegrate completely in the explosion, or, in the case of a massive star, the core can become a neutron star (generally a pulsar) or a black hole.

Supernovae can result from the death of an extremely massive star, many times heavier than the Sun. At the end of the life of this massive star, a non-fusible iron core is formed from fusion ashes. This iron core is pushed towards the Chandrasekhar limit till it surpasses it and therefore collapses. One of the most studied supernovae of this type is SN 1987A in the Large Magellanic Cloud.

A supernova may also result from mass transfer onto a white dwarf from a star companion in a double star system. The Chandrasekhar limit is surpassed from the infalling matter. The absolute luminosity of this latter type is related to properties of its light curve, so that these supernovae can be used to establish the distance to other galaxies.

Luminous red nova

Luminous red novae are stellar explosions caused by the merger of two stars.  They are not related to classical novae.  They have a characteristic red appearance and very slow decline following the initial outburst.

Novae

Novae are also the result of dramatic explosions, but unlike supernovae do not result in the destruction of the progenitor star. Also unlike supernovae, novae ignite from the sudden onset of thermonuclear fusion, which under certain high pressure conditions (degenerate matter) accelerates explosively. They form in close binary systems, one component being a white dwarf accreting matter from the other ordinary star component, and may recur over periods of decades to centuries or millennia. Novae are categorised as fast, slow or very slow, depending on the behaviour of their light curve. Several naked eye novae have been recorded, Nova Cygni 1975 being the brightest in the recent history, reaching 2nd magnitude.

Dwarf novae

Dwarf novae are double stars involving a white dwarf in which matter transfer between the component gives rise to regular outbursts. There are three types of dwarf nova:
 U Geminorum stars, which have outbursts lasting roughly 5–20 days followed by quiet periods of typically a few hundred days. During an outburst they brighten typically by 2–6 magnitudes. These stars are also known as SS Cygni variables after the variable in Cygnus which produces among the brightest and most frequent displays of this variable type.
 Z Camelopardalis stars, in which occasional plateaux of brightness called standstills are seen, part way between maximum and minimum brightness.
 SU Ursae Majoris stars, which undergo both frequent small outbursts, and rarer but larger superoutbursts. These binary systems usually have orbital periods of under 2.5 hours.

DQ Herculis variables

DQ Herculis systems are interacting binaries in which a low-mass star transfers mass to a highly magnetic white dwarf. The white dwarf spin period is significantly shorter than the binary orbital period and can sometimes be detected as a photometric periodicity. An accretion disk usually forms around the white dwarf, but its innermost regions are magnetically truncated by the white dwarf. Once captured by the white dwarf's magnetic field, the material from the inner disk travels along the magnetic field lines until it accretes. In extreme cases, the white dwarf's magnetism prevents the formation of an accretion disk.

AM Herculis variables

In these cataclysmic variables, the white dwarf's magnetic field is so strong that it synchronizes the white dwarf's spin period with the binary orbital period. Instead of forming an accretion disk, the accretion flow is channeled along the white dwarf's magnetic field lines until it impacts the white dwarf near a magnetic pole. Cyclotron radiation beamed from the accretion region can cause orbital variations of several magnitudes.

Z Andromedae variables

These symbiotic binary systems are composed of a red giant and a hot blue star enveloped in a cloud of gas and dust. They undergo nova-like outbursts with amplitudes of up to 4 magnitudes. The prototype for this class is Z Andromedae.

AM CVn variables

AM CVn variables are symbiotic binaries where a white dwarf is accreting helium-rich material from either another white dwarf, a helium star, or an evolved main-sequence star. They undergo complex variations, or at times no variations, with ultrashort periods.

Extrinsic variable stars

There are two main groups of extrinsic variables: rotating stars and eclipsing stars.

Rotating variable stars

Stars with sizeable sunspots may show significant variations in brightness as they rotate, and brighter areas of the surface are brought into view. Bright spots also occur at the magnetic poles of magnetic stars. Stars with ellipsoidal shapes may also show changes in brightness as they present varying areas of their surfaces to the observer.

Non-spherical stars

Ellipsoidal variables

These are very close binaries, the components of which are non-spherical due to their tidal interaction. As the stars rotate the area of their surface presented towards the observer changes and this in turn affects their brightness as seen from Earth.

Stellar spots

The surface of the star is not uniformly bright, but has darker and brighter areas (like the sun's solar spots). The star's chromosphere too may vary in brightness. As the star rotates we observe brightness variations of a few tenths of magnitudes.

FK Comae Berenices variables

These stars rotate extremely rapidly (~100 km/s at the equator); hence they are ellipsoidal in shape. They are (apparently) single giant stars with spectral types G and K and show strong chromospheric emission lines. Examples are FK Com, V1794 Cygni and UZ Librae. A possible explanation for the rapid rotation of FK Comae stars is that they are the result of the merger of a (contact) binary.

BY Draconis variable stars 

BY Draconis stars are of spectral class K or M and vary by less than 0.5 magnitudes (70% change in luminosity).

Magnetic fields

Alpha-2 Canum Venaticorum variables 

Alpha-2 Canum Venaticorum (α2 CVn) variables are main-sequence stars of spectral class B8–A7 that show fluctuations of 0.01 to 0.1 magnitudes (1% to 10%) due to changes in their magnetic fields.

SX Arietis variables

Stars in this class exhibit brightness fluctuations of some 0.1 magnitude caused by changes in their magnetic fields due to high rotation speeds.

Optically variable pulsars

Few pulsars have been detected in visible light. These neutron stars change in brightness as they rotate. Because of the rapid rotation, brightness variations are extremely fast, from milliseconds to a few seconds. The first and the best known example is the Crab Pulsar.

Eclipsing binaries

Extrinsic variables have variations in their brightness, as seen by terrestrial observers, due to some external source. One of the most common reasons for this is the presence of a binary companion star, so that the two together form a binary star. When seen from certain angles, one star may eclipse the other, causing a reduction in brightness. One of the most famous eclipsing binaries is Algol, or Beta Persei (β Per).

Algol variables

Algol variables undergo eclipses with one or two minima separated by periods of nearly constant light. The prototype of this class is Algol in the constellation Perseus.

Double Periodic variables

Double periodic variables exhibit cyclical mass exchange which causes the orbital period to vary predictably over a very long period. The best known example is V393 Scorpii.

Beta Lyrae variables

Beta Lyrae (β Lyr) variables are extremely close binaries, named after the star Sheliak. The light curves of this class of eclipsing variables are constantly changing, making it almost impossible to determine the exact onset and end of each eclipse.

W Serpentis variables
W Serpentis is the prototype of a class of semi-detached binaries including a giant or supergiant transferring material to a massive more compact star. They are characterised, and distinguished from the similar β Lyr systems, by strong UV emission from accretions hotspots on a disc of material.

W Ursae Majoris variables

The stars in this group show periods of less than a day. The stars are so closely situated to each other that their surfaces are almost in contact with each other.

Planetary transits

Stars with planets may also show brightness variations if their planets pass between Earth and the star. These variations are much smaller than those seen with stellar companions and are only detectable with extremely accurate observations. Examples include HD 209458 and GSC 02652-01324, and all of the planets and planet candidates detected by the Kepler Mission.

See also
 Guest star
 Irregular variable
 List of variable stars
 Low-dimensional chaos in stellar pulsations
 Stellar pulsations

References

Bibliography

External links
 The American Association of Variable Star Observers
 GCVS Variability Types
 Society for Popular Astronomy – Variable Star Section

 
Star types
Concepts in astronomy